Greater Sierra (also called Helmet Area) is a large oil and gas field in northeastern British Columbia, Canada. It is east and north from the town of Fort Nelson, extending to the Alberta and Northwest Territories borders (150 and 130km respectively).

It was discovered in 2002.

Drilling rig activity takes place largely during the winter months, when the otherwise soft muskeg and boreal forest can be crossed on winter roads. Infrastructure is funded by a combination of private and public funds.

Major projects tap in the large gas reservoirs hosted in Mississippian and Devonian limestones such as the Jean Marie Member of the Redknife Formation. More recent projects extract natural gas from the Muskwa Formation and Horn River Formation. Horizontal drilling and hydraulic fracturing techniques are used to extract the gas from the low permeability shales.

Due to the large extent, the field is served by several airstrips (Helmet Airport, Fort Nelson/Mobil Sierra Airport, Fort Nelson Airport). 

Companies with large interests in the area include Canadian Natural Resources and Petro-Canada.

See also
Canadian Oil Patch

References

Oil fields of British Columbia
Natural gas fields in Canada
Peace River Country